Barva is a district of the Barva canton, in the Heredia province of Costa Rica. The city is known for having a nice mix of rural and metropolitan landscape.

Toponymy
The name comes from Barvac or Barvak a cacique of the area around 1569, which in turn might come from either: 
 From New Tlapallan in Nahuatl language, or Tla pallapan, which in Huetar language was Tabaraba or Abaraba, hispanicized as Barba and meaning Black River or Dark River as explained by José Fidel Tristán in 1910.
 Bal (town) and wac (anteater), meaning Anteater Town, according to Luis Ferrero.
 Bar or bur (bees) with ba or bac (tribe), meaning Bees Tribe, as explained by bishop Bernardo Augusto Thiel y Hoffmann in late 19th century, from sources from 1575 and 1599.

By Decree 188 of 4 October 1974, the name changes from Barba to Barva.

Geography 
Barva has an area of  km² and an elevation of  metres.

It is located 3 km north of Heredia.

Culture

Patron saint and mask festival
The patron saint of the town is Saint Bartholomew. A large church, Iglesia de San Bartolomé de Barva, was established between 1568 and 1575 is in Barva. Every year on August 24, the people of the town have a celebration dedicated to the saint, and the highlight of the celebration is the unique masquerade, where people go out wearing masks and hit others with cow and pig bladders.

Demographics 

For the 2011 census, Barva had a population of  inhabitants.

Transportation

Road transportation 
The district is covered by the following road routes:
 National Route 119
 National Route 126

Notable people
Bernardo Rodríguez y Alfaro

References 

Districts of Heredia Province
Populated places in Heredia Province